Proanthocyanidin B3 may refer to:
 Procyanidin B3, a catechin dimer
 Prodelphinidin B3, a gallocatechin-catechin dimer